Live On Fire is the third live album by the German guitar-player Axel Rudi Pell.

Track listing

CD Version: Disc 1 (Essigfabrik, Cologne, Germany (October 18th 2012))
 "The Guillotine Suite (Intro)" (from Circle of the Oath)
 "Ghost In The Black" (from Circle of the Oath)
 "Strong as A Rock" (from Kings and Queens)
 "Before I Die" (from Circle of the Oath)
 "The Masquerade Ball/Casbah/Dreaming Dead/Whole Lotta Love/Dreaming Dead"  (from The Masquerade Ball/Between the Walls/The Crest)
 "Drum Solo"
 "Mystica/Mistreated/Mystica" (from Mystica)

CD Version: Disc 2 (Essigfabrik, Cologne, Germany (October 18th 2012))
 "Oceans of Time" (from Oceans of Time)
 "Circle of the Oath" (from Circle of the Oath)
 "Fool Fool" (from Black Moon Pyramid)
 "Keyboard Solo/Carousel/Jam/Carousel" (from Oceans of Time)
 "Tear Down The Walls/Nasty Reputation" (from The Masquerade Ball/Nasty Reputation)
 "Rock the Nation" (from Mystica)

DVD Version: Disc 1 (Essigfabrik, Cologne, Germany (October 18th 2012))
 "The Guillotine Suite (Intro)"
 "Ghost In The Black"
 "Strong as A Rock"
 "Before I Die"
 "The Masquerade Ball/Casbah/Dreaming Dead/Whole Lotta Love/Dreaming Dead"
 "Drum Solo"
 "Mystica/Mistreated/Mystica"
 "Oceans of Time"
 "Circle of the Oath"
 "Fool Fool"
 "Keyboard Solo/Carousel/Jam/Carousel"
 "Tear Down The Walls/Nasty Reputation"
 "Rock the Nation"

DVD Version: Disc 2 (Rock of Ages Festival (July 28th 2012) + bonus features)
 "The Guillotine Suite (Intro)"
 "Ghost In The Black"
 "Strong as A Rock"
 "Before I Die"
 "The Masquerade Ball/Casbah/Dreaming Dead/Whole Lotta Love/Dreaming Dead"
 "Drum Solo"
 "Mystica/Mistreated/Mystica"
 "Oceans of Time"
 "Circle of the Oath"
 "Tear Down The Walls/Nasty Reputation"
 "Rock the Nation"
 "Axel Rudi Pell: The Home Story (bonus)"
 "Axel Rudi Pell: Interview (bonus)"
 "Hallelujah (Music Video) (bonus)"

Credits
Johnny Gioeli - vocals
Axel Rudi Pell - guitar
Volker Krawczak - bass guitar
Fredy Doernberg - keyboard
Mike Terrana - drums

References

External links

Axel Rudi Pell albums
2013 live albums
SPV/Steamhammer albums